Digby Stuart College is one of the four constituent colleges of the University of Roehampton.

The college was established in 1874 as Wandsworth College, a women's teacher training college, by the Roman Catholic Society of the Sacred Heart, an order of French religious women who settled at Roehampton in 1850, having first arrived in England in 1846. The college moved to Roehampton and was renamed in honour of Mother Janet Stuart and Mother Mabel Digby in 1946. The college became coeducational in 1971.

In 1975, the college became part of the Roehampton Institute of Higher Education, which became Roehampton University in 2004.

Currently, approximately 2,000 of Roehampton's 8,000 students, are assigned to Digby Stuart College with about 450 living on the campus.

See also
Network of Sacred Heart Schools
In 1979 Ann Camp ARCA who had been teaching calligraphy to the BEd students began a course of calligraphy and bookbinding at Digby Stuart College, one of only two such course in the Western world. Twelve students per year were taken on, most of whom already possessed an undergraduate degree although a number of students held a PhD. A Certificate in Calligraphy and Bookbinding was offered, followed by a Diploma in Calligraphy, followed in turn by an Advanced Diploma in Calligraphy.
Ann Camp retired in 1989 and although the course continued for some years afterwards, Digby Stuart College withdrew its support and the course transferred to Kensington Palace under the aegis of the Prince of Wales Trust.

Among those who studied calligraphy at Digby Stuart College were
Lorraine Brady FSSI

Ruth Bruckner FSSI

Denis Brown FSSI 

Christopher Calderhead FSSI 

Lindsay Castell FSSI

Colleen Cavin FSSI

Prof Ewan Clayton MBE 

Gareth Colgan FSSI

Margaret Daubney FSSI 

Hazel Dolby FSSI 

Rodney Edwards FSSI

Gerald Fleuss FSSI  

Ethna Gallacher FSSI 

Patricia Gidney FSSI

Christopher Haanes FSSI 

Angela Hickey FSSI

Susan Hufton FSSI  

Sally-Mae Joseph FSSI

Veiko Kespersaks FSSI

Lily Lee

Marion McKenzie FSSI

Richard Middleton FSSI  

John Nash PhD FSSI  

John Neilson PhD 

Brody Neuenschwander PhD FSSI   (add link to his Wikipedia page)

Terry O’Donnell FSSI

Margaret Prasthofer FSSI

John Prestianni FSSI

Diana Stetson 

References: 

(1) Calligraphy Masterclass, ed. Peter Halliday ISBN 1-85471-656-5
(2) Practical Calligraphy, John R Nash & Gerald Fleuss ISBN 0 60057177 7
(3) Letter Arts Review vol 33 no 2 ISSN 0895-7819
(4) Handbok I Kalligrafi, Christopher Haanes ISBN82-03-22082-7

References

Other source
 Digby Stuart History

University of Roehampton
Teacher training colleges in the United Kingdom
Catholic universities and colleges in England
Educational institutions established in 1874
1874 establishments in England
Sacred Heart universities and colleges
Former women's universities and colleges in the United Kingdom